The Bolt (French: Le Verrou), also known as The Lock, is a gallant scene painted by Jean-Honoré Fragonard in 1777. It is one of the most famous paintings by the painter. The common interpretation suggests that the scene depicts two lovers entwined in a bedroom, the man locking the door. The painting is preserved in the Louvre Museum, in the section of the Department of Paintings devoted to eighteenth-century French painting on the second floor of the Sully wing. It stands together with some of the most famous pictorial masterpieces of the same period, in a chronologically organized path. This painting, a true symbol of the libertine spirit of the 18th century, reflects the state of mind adopted by the painters of the era, notably that of François Boucher, one of Fragonard's teachers and a great representative of rococo painting.

History of the work

Commissioned work 
The work was commissioned in 1773 by Louis-Gabriel Véri-Raionard, Marquis de Véri (1722–1785). Having been produced for such a reputable and demanding collector, this erotic painting, ostensibly light but asserting a real ambition, formed part of a collection of depictions that were amorous, at times coarse and yet eminently representative of the spirit of French society at a time when the Enlightenment movement was about to waver. The canvas seemed to unveil a profound revitalization of Fragonard's inspiration that first distinguished itself in historical paintings, in particular Jeroboam Sacrificing to Idols, first prize of Rome 1752. The obtaining of this distinction allowed Fragonard to enjoy a great fame. His scenes of gallantry were extremely popular, and the nobility offered him many commissions, like that of Baron Saint-Julian for The Swing (1767).

Originally, Fragonard had given The Bolt a more suitable twin: The Contract, itself following on from another called The Armoire. The painting, which belonged to the Marquis of Véri's collection, was brought to us thanks to the etching of Maurice Blot, who had, 8 years previously, made an etching of The Bolt. This print, considered as mediocre, had great success, however, attributable in large part to the fame of Fragonard. Indeed, a theory claimed that the two works, The Contract and The Bolt, constitute, along with another painting of Fragonard, The Armoire, the three chapters of a novel in which the heroes would be the two lovers. The Bolt illustrated the passion of the couple, The Armoire, the discovery of their affair and being caught in the act, and The Contract, their reconciliation.

The Bolt is often considered alongside a work of more sacred inspiration, The Adoration of the Shepherds (1775). This canvas, also commissioned by the marquis, was suggested by Fragonard himself. It shows Fragonard's will to revive holy artwork and draw contrast between two types of love: carnal or libertine love, belonging to the 18th century, and sacred, religious love.

Analysis

Source of inspiration and realization 
Fragonard started by making several sketches and surveys of The Bolt. He may have used models for the realization of his work. He drew inspiration from writings of his time. Gault de Saint-Germain said of him that "Ariosto, Boccaccio, La Fontaine were his inspirers and his ingenious teachers, spiritual in the inventiveness, he got sometimes the freshness of the color of his inimitable models."

Like François Boucher, Fragonard prepared his canvases with a toned ground of red or gray. On this he first sketched the subject by an outline, then applied the paint in several superimposed layers. His stroke was fine, light but precise, nervous and effective.

External links
http://cartelfr.louvre.fr/cartelfr/visite?srv=car_not_frame&idNotice=10905

1777 paintings
Paintings by Jean-Honoré Fragonard
Erotic art
Paintings in the Louvre by French artists